The 2011 FIBA Europe Under-20 Championship for Women Division B was the seventh edition of the Division B of the Women's European basketball championship for national under-20 teams. It was held in Ohrid, Republic of Macedonia, from 8 to 17 July 2011. Sweden women's national under-20 basketball team won the tournament.

Participating teams

  (16th place, 2010 FIBA Europe Under-20 Championship for Women Division A)

  (15th place, 2010 FIBA Europe Under-20 Championship for Women Division A)

First round
In the first round, the teams were drawn into two groups. The first four teams from each group advance to the quarterfinals, the other teams will play in the classification round for 9th to 11th place.

Group A

Group B

Classification round for 9th–11th place

Championship playoffs

Quarterfinals

5th–8th place playoffs

Semifinals

7th place match

5th place match

3rd place match

Final

Final standings

References

2011
2011–12 in European women's basketball
International youth basketball competitions hosted by North Macedonia
FIBA U20
July 2011 sports events in Europe